Halomon is a polyhalogenated monoterpene first isolated from the marine red algae Portieria hornemannii.  Halomon has attracted research interest because of its promising profile of selective cytotoxicity that suggests its potential use as an antitumor agent.

Halomon is in a class of chemical compounds known as halocarbons, which are often potent alkylating agents which may be toxic to individual cells or to living organisms.  The red algae that naturally produce halomon and other related compounds probably do so as a poisonous defense against fish or other marine life that may see it as a potential source of food.  Halomon, however, is a selective toxin;  studies at the National Cancer Institute have indicated that it is more toxic to certain types of tumor cells than to other cells.

The algae that produces halomon is difficult to locate, identify, and collect and the concentration of halomon in the organism is extremely low. Therefore, obtaining a sufficient amount of halomon to conduct preclinical research has been difficult.  Consequently, there has been active interest in developing synthetic methods in the laboratory for the preparation of halomon and related compounds.

Recent research has shown that halomon and a related halogenated monoterpene may act as demethylating agents, suggesting a possible mechanism of action for the pharmacological effects of halomon.

References

External links

Halomon at Reciprocal Net
Halomon at Harvard University's ChemBank

Halogen-containing natural products
Monoterpenes
Organochlorides
Organobromides
Haloalkenes